Syed Abul Hasan Ali Hasani Nadwi (also known as Ali Miyan; 5 December 1913 – 31 December 1999) was a leading Islamic scholar, thinker, writer, preacher, reformer and a Muslim public intellectual of 20th century India and the author of numerous books on history, biography, contemporary Islam, and the Muslim community in India, one of the most prominent figure of Deoband School. His teachings covered the entire spectrum of the collective existence of the Muslim Indians as a living community in the national and international context. Due to his command over Arabic, in writings and speeches, he had a wide area of influence extending far beyond the Sub-continent, particularly in the Arab World. During 1950s and 1960s he stringently attacked Arab nationalism and pan-Arabism as a new jahiliyyah and promoted pan-Islamism. He began his academic career in 1934 as a teacher in Nadwatul Ulama, later in 1961; he became Chancellor of Nadwa and in 1985, he was appointed as Chairman of Oxford Centre for Islamic Studies.

He had a lifelong association with Tablighi Jamaat. For decades, he enjoyed universal respect, was accepted by the non-Muslims, at the highest level, as the legitimate spokesman for the concerns and aspirations of the entire Muslim community. Islam and the World is the much acclaimed book of Nadwi for which he received accolades throughout, especially Arab world where it was first published in 1951. His books are part of syllabic studies in various Arab Universities. In 1951, during his second Hajj, the key-bearer of the Kaaba, opened its door for two days and allowed him to take anyone he chose inside. He was the first Alim from Hindustan who was given the key to Kaaba by the Royal Family of Saudi Arabia to allow him to enter whenever he chose during his pilgrimage. He was the chairman of Executive Committee of Darul Uloom Deoband and president of All India Muslim Personal Law Board. He was the founder of Payam-e-Insaniyaat Movement and co-founder of All India Muslim Majlis-e-Mushawarat and Academy of Islamic Research & Publication. Internationally recognized, he was one of the Founding Members of the Muslim World League and served on the Higher Council of the Islamic University of Madinah, the Executive Committee of the League of Islamic Universities. The lectures he delivered at Indian, Arab and western Universities have been appreciated as original contribution to the study of Islam and on Islam's relevance to the modern age. As a theorist of a revivalist movement, in particular he believed Islamic civilisation could be revived via a synthesis of western ideas and Islam. In 1980, he received the King Faisal International Prize, followed by the Sultan of Brunei International Prize and the UAE Award in 1999.

Early life 
Abul Hasan Ali Nadwi was born in the Takiya Kalaan Rae-Bareilly in North India in 5 December 1913, he was named Ali and his full name is Ali bin Abdul Hay bin Fahruddeen Al-Hasani. His linage joins to Imam Al-Hasan bin Sabt bin Ali bin Abi Talib. Scion of a educated family, which has produced scholars, Ulama, Atkiya, spiritual preceptors, mujahedeen, professors, civil service officers, he was an eminent scholar, thinker, writer, an Alim, a preacher, a reformer and a personality of the world of Islam in the last half century. His father was Abdul Hayy Hasani, author of famous books like Nuzhatul Khawatir (a biographical dictionary of Indian Ulama) and Al-Thaqafah al-Islamiyah fil-Hind (Islamic Culture in India). He was a descendant of Syed Ahmad Barelvi who had led a Jihad movement against the British occupation, established an Islamic state in the North Western Frontier (now in Pakistan) and fell martyr on the battlefield of Balakot in 1831. Moreover, he was one of the few non-Arabs today who had fully mastered spoken and written Arabic. Although he is an Arab by lineage, yet his family had lost its roots with the Arabic world and he grew up as an Indian Muslim. He was popularly known in India as Ali Miyan. He was popularly known world-wide by the name of Nadwi, which was not his family name; it was synonymous to higher rank of Islamic intellectuals belonged to a particular institution: the scholars educated at the Nadwat-ul-ulama in (Lucknow), India, took the name `Nadwi' and the name `Nadwi' in this research refers to Abul Hasan Ali Nadwi.

Nadwi grew up and was guided in a God fearing environment in the guardianship of his family. His father Hakim Syed Abdul Hayy Nadwi al-Hasani served as Rector of Nadwat-ul-ulama until he breathed his last on Friday 1923 when Abul Hasan Ali Nadwi was nine years of age. Having lost his father, young Ali grew up under the shadow of his mother and the guardianship of his brother, Hakim Abdul Ali Nadwi (who qualified from both Dar al-Ulum Deoband and Nadwat-ul-ulama). He lived in his early childhood in Takiyya Kalan; Rae-Bareilly. He later migrated to Lucknow with his father because of his father's profession as a doctor. His mother had memorized the Qur’ān and acquired higher education, a rare distinction for a woman of her times. She was a poet as well as a writer. She wrote the book for the guidance of women and young girls with the name of Husnul Maashirah (Social Manners) and the book of poems by the name of Bahrurrahmah. When Ali was young he spent most of his time in his elder brother's house, under his supervision and tender care. A particularly important influence on him at this stage was his elder brother, Sayyid Abd al-Ali al Hasani who later went on to be trained as a medical doctor at King George's Medical College, Lucknow, and then assumed the post of Rector of the Nadwat-ul-Ulama. His elder brother was able, through his deep knowledge both in western education and Islam, to ensure his upbringing in the Islamic way of life. By this time he had developed a deep commitment to the cause of Islam.

Intellectual Milieu 
He received a B.A in Arabic literature from the University of Lucknow in 1927. In order to be trained as an Alim (religious scholar), he was sent to Nadwatul Ulama for higher studies. Nadwat al-ulama also known as Nadwa, the choice of the name got inspiration from a hall in Makkah, where nobles used to assemble to debate and discuss. It was one of the renowned Islamic universities in the world, which has produced several famous scholars. It was founded in 1894 at Kanpur and eventually shifted to Lucknow (India) in 1898. It was established with the objective of countering the challenges of western education; striking out equilibrium between classical Islam and modernity and producing a new breed of Islamic scholars of higher level, molded in classical Islamic disciplines and new ideas to regain the intellectual initiative lost in the wake of colonial occupation. At Nadwa, young Nadwi was exposed to new trends prevalent in Islamic thoughts in other Muslim countries. He was also benefitted from the two leading Arab teachers at Dar al ulum. One of those teachers is Khalil Muhammad of Yemen and Muhammad Taqi-ud-Din al-Hilali of Morocco who taught him modern verbal and written Arabic. He studied Hadith under Hussain Ahmed Madani at Darul Uloom Deoband and Tafsir under Ahmed Ali Lahori where he came in touch with Iqbal whose poetry left an abiding impression on him.

The major turning point in Nadwi's life came in 1934, when he was appointed to teach Arabic and Qur’anic commentary at Nadwat al-ulama, after the completion of his studies. The Nadwa committed itself to spread the teachings of Nadwi since he played a pivotal role in turning the institution into well acknowledged research center world widely, just as he was to remain central to the life of the institution, turning it into a widely recognized centre for Islamic research. As Hasan writes, one of his principal concerns as head of the institution was to promote suitable changes in the educational system in accordance with the demand of the modem age.

Intellectual Discourse

Reconstruction of Western Civilization 
West with its technology has been able to master the civilization of the world today because it is considered able to answer the challenges and demands of the modern world. Nadwi provides insightful views and ideas about how the concept of Islam in life. In some of his ideas, he does not give Misconceptions of the goodness of life with the advancement of technology and identity, but the value of the glorified modernity of the West has the building of cultural values which is 'misconception' with Islamic terminology. Nadwi in this case also reveals that tribal wars and identity with the West can be seen from two perspectives; First, the defense of identity as a positive color, this view is expressed as an appreciation of the consistency of geographical dichotomy and western culture in maintaining the identity and even affect the surrounding civilization, as previously revealed that the West despite having areas that tend to have the same land but can still survive as an identity the substantial where the one with the other cannot be equated. According to Nadwi such a concept contains an Islamic value. A Muslim must be able to show his identity as a Muslim, preserving this identity is certainly not merely an identity in a literal sense, more than that, the identity that is meant is a terminological meaning that embodies the various values that emulate it. A Muslim should have an existence based on Islam (Al-Quran and Ḥadis). Islam as a value (identity) must be maintained in accordance with the indicators (arguments) in it. For example in terms of association, in terms of neighborhood, in terms of dress, including in terms of economic. Because in the true Islam through the value contained in it has contained a variety of teachings that are quite universal, including in the things mentioned above. Maintaining Identity as a Muslim the law must be done because that is part of the meaning of Islam itself as a theology (belief). Nadwi reveals that maintaining identity is the first step to strengthening faith in Muslims.

Secondly, Western identity is a negative meaning. The West does maintain its identity so that with that identity they proudly and stigmatized 'tilted' towards another identity. Al-Nadwi reveals that Islam does not teach so, Western modernism according to him should be responded proportionately because the teaching of identity contained in it is contains the value of Jahiliyyah where the people who no longer respect other people who are different. Islam teaches li ta'arafu between humans amid the difference. Al-Nadwî reveals the West despite appearing with its stunning medal face, but it holds an undeniable dilemma, that in fact the West is not united in a strong (identity) relationship. They are in a separate conscience between one and the other with the boundaries of tribal egoism and material interests. This is according to al-Nadwî that in fact the West has been transformed into Jahiliyyah modern. Al-Nadwî further explained that the recognition of identity should be in Islam with the proper terminology. Al-Nadwi reveals one offer is back to Islam. Islam is meant universally, including the reflection of its civilization. Long before the West which has been widely claimed to have modernized modernization, Islam actually has done that long before the 7th century. Al-Nadwî in this discussion exemplifies the history of the glory of Islam in the days of Umar bin Abd al-Aziz (717-720). Abul Hasan Ali al-Hasani al-Nadwî explains that humans can be united with the glue of religion that haq is the religion of Islam, not only for the Muslims itself, more than it covers the welfare of mankind, because Islam is revealed to all nature. One reflection which was then put forward by al-Nadwî is that along with the glory of Islam is also dragged the glory of his people universally which in turn is not only merely touch the Muslims themselves, but also by other people who are socially not to be distinguished. According to al-Nadwi, this kind of context is not visible from the civilization (modernization) of the West today, the modernization of the West according to him is colonized where progress adversely affects other identities. In examining identity and modernization, al-Nadwî offers several opinions, first formal approaches, two historical approaches, three social approaches, four economical approaches. In the formal order of Religion Islam has a source of teaching that becomes the frame of every movement, namely the Qur'an and Hadith. In the context of modernization and identity the Qur'an seems to have a not-so-small concept, in which the Qur'an for example contains fraternal values, trade terminology, association, marriage, dress, education, and the Qur'an also contain scientific values, health, and so forth. According to al-Nadwi, the Qur'an with its perfect content should be part of the foundation of living for a Muslim. The textuality of the verses on some sides may be clarified sociologically based on the practices shown by the Prophet Muḥammad. In the context of modernity, there seems to be no doubt that the Prophet Muhammad with his teachings of Islam has managed to modernize Arabia. Practical life shown by the Prophet also becomes hand in hand that accompanies the content of the Qur'an.

Historical Approach; Islam once 'lead the world'. This historical approach can be traced in his book Saviours of Islamic Spirit; in this book he introduces various figures who can be role models of a Muslim, such as Umar II, Hasan al-Basri, Ahmad ibn Hanbal, Al-Ghazali, Abdul Qadir Gilani, Rumi, Ibn Taymiyyah, Shah Waliullah Dehlawi, Ahmad Sirhindi. In the muqaddimah part of this book he reveals a small conclusion that "Islam never thirsts mujaddid". According to al-Nadwî, the error is much seen from the Muslims themselves in choosing the wrong path. If the early Muslims dealt with the heresy and the conflict of understanding, then in modern times and millennia Islam confronted the more complex term of 'Jahiliyyah' culture Al-Nadwî advocated, in minimizing the impact of modernization of Western Jahiliyyah today, the regeneration of Muslims should be introduced to a clear historiography of Islam as a movement of civilization progress and assert that Western modernization contains primitive Jahiliyah values. This historical study according to al-Nadwî needs to be done in conveying the Islamic treasures of its existence. Al-Nadwi said in a social approach how much criticism is expressed against the West actually refers more to the social elements that are in it. Western culture according to al-Nadwî does not at all reflect Islamic fundamental values in any way. The historical fact mentioned by al-Nadwî in his book, that more than 32,000 death penalties in Europe are burned alive. According to al-Nadwî, the unfair Law that Europeans applied to other nations seemed to portray enmity and eliminate the principle of justice which is the principle of a law, not just the classical era, this unfair legal fanaticism continues to be applied by the West in strengthening its power as a superpower medieval age. Al-Nadwî also provided a constructive critique of Western education. According to al-Nadwî, Western education led to the frost and decline of morality due to the loneliness of spiritual decline. Al-Nadwî also gave various analyzes that Western Education orientation is a lot of material, wants a high position and earn a large salary without implanting spiritual value. According to al-Nadwi, Western education is racing to become stronger and then with that power they make other nation tips slumped. Al-Nadwî in his book Imam Abd al-Qadir al-Jailânî reveals this condition by relating it to civilization in the time of al-Jailānî, he writes: "...'Abd al-Qadir al-Jailānî has witnessed what has been fall the lives of Muslims of his day. They live fragmented and hostile. Love of the world has dominated in addition to fighting for honor on the side of King and Sultan, man has turned to matter, position and power...". In addition to his social criticisms of the West, al-Nadwî gave a fairly intense notion of social life. This is evident from the practices of daily life. Al-Nadwî in some facts, famous as people who closely associate with the community, as much expressed by the surrounding community as well as observations that once the author witnessed one example that al-Nadwî spelled out routinely provide material assistance to Muslims and non-Muslims after each prayer Asr at home, this assistance is expected to be given to 40 people. This phenomena as a form of bi al-hâl's preaching to non-Muslims to in turn see Islam as a potentially positive enough to follow.

This attitude as an orientation of the word of Allâh in Al-Baqara: "There is no compulsion to (enter) religion (Islam); in fact it is clearly the right path rather than a misguided path. Therefore, whoever denies Thaghut and believes in Allâh, then he has indeed held on to a very strong rope that will never break. And Allâh is Hearing, Knower, Knowing". Al-Nadwi in his ideas in his daily life towards non-Muslims is quite diplomatic in his book, Islam and the World al-Nadwî quotes the Qur'anic verse: It means: "Those who believe fight in the cause of Allah, and those who reject Faith in the way of Thaghut, therefore fight the friends of Shaytaan, because in fact the deception of Satan is weak". Al-Nadwî reveals that wars are very close to the devil's demands. With him, the most appropriate da'wah for the present condition is by deeds (bi al-hâl), with which the best Islamic da'wah is to show a self-identity as a Muslim based on his teachings. Al-Nadwî criticized the social life that denied the concept of Hospitality, amid Western material progress, he saw no strong interpersonal unity among they so not infrequently neighbors do not know each other, do not help each other let alone visit each other. The concept that is in the Western stretcher is anti-social. One thing must also be known by the Muslims against the existence of the West, that they tend to ignore Religion, they do not know God, even Atheists. So social is often seen is social freedom, social relationships are free sex, pornography and so forth. According to al-Nadwî, Western westernization is very necessary to watch out for, the colonization of Western culture not only erode the culture of a nation but also even erode its Religion.

Anti-Zionist Views 

Nadwi's writings are full of Anti-zionist rhetoric. According to him, exposure to "injustice, oppression, chastisement, extradition, troubles, hardships" and domination by other nations is the destiny of Zionists. A typical racial character had emerged in them because of "political serfdom, oppression and anguish suffered indefinitely". They were globally infamous for being excessively proud of their genealogy. While they were "meek and submissive in distress, they were tyrannical and mean when they had the upper hand". "Hypocrisy, deceit, treachery, selfishness, cruelty and usuriousness" had become integral to their nature. Nadwi points out how the Qur’an repeatedly refers to "the extent to which they had sunk into degradation in the sixth and the seventh centuries". The Zionist heritage, according to Nadwi, was primarily composed of "intrigue and crime, violence and high-handed tactics", "their inborn tendencies which could clearly be discerned at any time or place where they have happened to reside, like a pivot on which their entire intelligence and endeavours have always revolved for the satisfaction of their ulterior motives". "Every insurrection and revolution, conspiracy and intrigue,
lawlessness and anarchy" had been the brainchild of the Zionists. They had triggered "every movement designed to foment social, political, economic and moral disintegration of the non-Zionist people". The characteristics of Zionists, according to Nadwi, were exultingly summed up by an eminent Zionist, Dr. Oscar Levy, who described them as "the rulers of the world; mischief mongers who foment
every trouble and turmoil, wherever it might be". He did not even spare the non-proselytizing nature of Judaism. He believed that the Zionists have failed to give any message of salvation for humanity. The reason for this, Nadwi explains, is that, according to the Zionists, salvation is determined by birth, irrespective of one’s belief or action. This notion of the superiority of the Jewish race "signally incompatible with the spirit of any universal message of brotherhood and equality of mankind....Such an idea, naturally, delimits even the scope of divine guidance and salvation and places restriction on its dissemination beyond the closed circle of one’s blood kin".

This, according to Nadwi also explains why Zionism can never become a universal religion and why it remains a non-proselytizing faith. He adds: The logical result of such an attitude was that the Zionists should discriminate against other nations and evolve such norms of virtue and vice, right and wrong, which should make allowance for the superiority of one race over the other. And, then, nothing more is required to justify and persist in the cruelest (sic) injustice against the non-Zionist people. The Qur’an alludes to this very attitude of the Zionists when it says: That is because they say: We have no duty to the Gentiles.

Partition of India 
He opposed the partition of India, agreeing with his teacher Hussain Ahmad Madani.

Writings

Abul Hassan Ali Nadwi primarily wrote in Arabic, although also in Urdu, and wrote more than fifty books on history, theology, and biography, and thousands of seminar papers, articles, and recorded speeches.

His 1950 book Maza Khasiral Alam be Inhitat al-Muslimeen (lit. What did the world lose with the decline of Muslims?), translated into English as Islam and the World, was largely responsible for popularizing the concept of "modern Jahiliyya" The Islamist author Syed Qutb commended Nadwi's writings for his use of the word jahiliyya to describe not a particular age in history (as earlier Muslim scholars did) but a state of moral corruption and materialism.

He wrote 'Qasas al-Nabiyyeen' (translated as 'Stories of the Prophets') for his nephew that became famous among the Arabic learners and the book was soon included in the syllabi for teaching Arabic at various institutions around the globe.   Being a fan of Dr. Muhammad Iqbal, Ali Nadwi also undertook the task of introducing Iqbal and his Islamic thoughts to the Arab world. Thus, he wrote 'Rawa'i' Iqbal' which was subsequently rendered in to Urdu as 'Nuqoosh-i-Iqbal'.

He wrote a detailed biography of his father in Urdu entitled 'Hayat-e-Abdul Haiy'. He also wrote a biographical account of his mother in 'Zikr-e-Khayr'. While he also penned his autobiography, 'Karawan-e-Zindagi', in 7 volumes.

An adherent of pan-Islamism, he opposed secular Arab nationalism and pan-Arabism. He also had a lifelong association with the Tablighi Jamaat.

Dr. Shah has summarized some of his salient thoughts in the following words:'Maulana Ali Nadwi sincerely and staunchly believed that the real threat to the modern world, especially the Muslim world, is neither the lack of material development nor the political disturbances, rather it’s the moral and spiritual decline. He firmly believed that Islam alone has the ability to overturn this and thus Muslims must wake up to make an effort in this regard. By staying back, he argued, the Muslims were not only failing themselves rather the entire humanity! He stressed on Muslims, especially those living in a Muslim majority countries (like Pakistan), to develop a society based on Islamic principles that could become a model (for its moral and spiritual values) for the rest of the world. He was a strong critic of nationalism and stressed upon working for the humanity, collectively. He also laid much emphasis on the crucial role women for upholding the teachings of Islam in a society.

Instead of trying to shut their doors for the incoming western influence, he believed that the intellectual Muslims should study the contemporary Western ideologies and form their own ideology in its response, withholding the 'superior moral values of Islam'. He opposed 'Islamic groups' from clashing with the 'secular elite' in Muslim majority countries and instead encouraged for an 'inclusive approach' wherein the 'secular elite' could be gradually and positively called towards Islam, without causing any chaos in the society. Similarly, he also urged Muslims living as a minority to maintain peace and create a valuable position for themselves through hard work and exemplary morals.'

Positions, honours and awards
 1962 Founding member/Secretary of the first inaugural session and foundation of Muslim World League in Mecca.
 1980 King Faisal Award
 Founding Chairman of Oxford Centre for Islamic Studies.
 1984 President of 'League of Islamic Literature'.
 1999 'Islamic Personality of Year' award established by Sheikh Mohammed of United Arab Emirates.
 1999 Sultan of Brunei Award

After his death, the International Islamic University, Islamabad (IIUI), Pakistan, arranged a seminar in his honor and published the speeches and articles presented therein as ‘Maulana Sayyid Abul Hasan Ali Nadwi – Hayat-o-Afkar Kay Chand Pehlu’

Access to the Kaaba
In 1951, during his second pilgrimage (Hajj) to Makkah the key-bearer of the Kaaba (Islam's holiest building), opened its door for two days and allowed Abul Hassan Ali Nadwi to take anyone he chose inside.

He was given the key to the Kaaba to allow him to enter whenever he chose during his pilgrimage.

Death
Abul Hasan Ali Hasani Nadwi died on 23 Ramadan, 1420 AH (31 December 1999) in Raebareli, India at the age of 85.

Legacy

PhD Thesis 
PhD and MA thesis written on Abul Hasan Ali Hasani Nadwi:

Biography 
Biography written on Abul Hasan Ali Hasani Nadwi:

Journal article 
Journal article on Abul Hasan Ali Hasani Nadwi:

Abul Hasan Ali Nadwi Center For Research, Dawah And Islamic Thoughts 
Dar-e-Arafat is the representative institution of Nadwi’s ideology and dawah. This department has been established by the name of "Abul Hasan Ali Nadwi center for Research, Dawah and Islamic thoughts" It provides Free Islamic books, print Islamic books, online free islamic books, PDF books etc.

Allama Abul Hasan Ali Nadwi Educational and Welfare Foundation, Aligarh 
Established in 2003 to uplift the standard of Muslim minorities in economic, religious, social, cultural and educational fields. It is located in Hamdard Nagar "D" Dhorra Byepass Road Aligarh, Uttar Pradesh.

Shaykh Abul Hasan Ali Nadwi Islamic Research Center, Dhaka, Bangladesh 
Shaykh Abul Hasan Ali Nadwi Islamic Research Center, Dhaka is a unique Institution for Higher Islamic Education & Research in Bangladesh.

See also 
 Bibliography of Abul Hasan Ali Hasani Nadwi

References

Further reading

External links 

Abul Hasan Ali Hasani Nadwi
Deobandis
1913 births
1999 deaths
People from Raebareli
Indian Islamists
Indian Sunni Muslim scholars of Islam
Hanafis
20th-century Indian philosophers
Urdu-language writers
Darul Uloom Nadwatul Ulama
20th-century Muslim scholars of Islam
Critics of Ahmadiyya
Darul Uloom Nadwatul Ulama alumni
Indian Islamic religious leaders
Darul Uloom Deoband alumni
Chancellors of Darul Uloom Nadwatul Ulama
Managers of Nadwatul Ulama
Writers from Lucknow
20th-century Indian Muslims
Islam in India
Founders of Indian schools and colleges
Muslim reformers
Mujaddid
Muslim Brotherhood philosophers
Indian magazine founders